Ahmet Erdengiz served as the ambassador of the Turkish Republic of Northern Cyprus (TRNC) to the United States of America from 1998 to 2002 and since 2009, has been serving a four-year ambassadorial duty in Brussels, Belgium. Since the TRNC is not a recognized entity, his title was the Representative of the TRNC. In 2009, he began to serve as the Undersecretary of Foreign Affairs. He was also appointed to the Committee on Missing Persons in Cyprus as the Assistant to the Turkish Member.

References

External links 
Erdengiz Responded to Hrisostomos
Fences Might Be the Right Thing for Multiethnic Nation of Cyprus
Committee on Missing Persons
Well-known Actor Faces War Crimes Charges After Talk-show Confession
Cyprus PIO: Turkish Press and Other Media, 07-09-26

Year of birth missing (living people)
Living people
Turkish Cypriot politicians
Ambassadors of Northern Cyprus to the United States